The Circular Staircase is a 1915 mystery silent film directed by Edward LeSaint and starring Guy Oliver, Eugenie Besserrer, and Stella Razeto. The film was produced by the Selig Polyscope Company. It is based on the mystery novel of the same name by Mary Roberts Rinehart, which was originally published in five parts starting with the November 1907 issue of All-Story magazine. The film is now lost.

Plot 
Halsey and Gertrude Innes, along with Gertrude's fiancé Jack Bailey, visit their Aunt Ray who is leasing banker Paul Armstrong's home for the summer. Aunt Ray finds Arnold Armstrong, Paul's son, dead at the foot of the staircase and suspicion falls on Jack since he is Arnold's business enemy. Lousie Armstrong, who is travelling with her dad, is found hiding and dazed. The house keeper, Mrs. Watson, develops blood poisoning and falls down the stairs. Soon after, news arrives from Armstrong's bank, which was recently robbed, that Armstrong has died. Mrs. Watson confesses to shooting Arnold because he had beat her with a golf club. Aunt Ray accidentally discovers Paul Armstrong hiding in a secret room and screams, alerting the others. Detective Jamieson and the new gardener Alex pursue Armstrong. During the chase, Armstrong slips and fatally falls down the stairs. It is revealed that Alex was actually Jack in disguise trying to clear his name. Gertrude embraces him, and Louise hugs Halsey.

Cast 

 Guy Oliver as Halsey Innes
 Eugenie Besserer as Aunt Ray
 Stella Razeto as Gertrude Innes
 Edith Johnson as Louise Armstrong
 William Howard as Jack Bailey
 Anna Dodge as Liddy
 Jane Watson as Mrs. Watson
 F. J. Tyler as Old Tom
 Fred Huntley as Detective Jamieson
 Clyde Benson as Arnold Armstrong
 George Hernandez as Paul Armstrong
 Bertram Grassby as Dr. Walker

Legacy 
Mary Roberts Rinehart adapted The Circular Staircase into a play titled The Bat with Avery Hopwood. The play opened on August 23, 1920, at Morosco Theatre. It ran for 878 performances on Broadway before travelling to other cities as well. The Bat would spawn adaptations of its own, including a novel titled The Bat and three movies titled The Bat (1926), The Bat Whispers (1930), and The Bat (1959). In his autobiography, Bob Kane says that he got the inspiration for Batman from The Bat.

References 

1915 films
Lost American films
Films based on works by Mary Roberts Rinehart
Selig Polyscope Company films
American silent films
1915 mystery films
American mystery films
1915 lost films
Lost mystery films
Films directed by Edward LeSaint
1910s American films